Huaquan is a style of Long Fist Kung Fu (Changquan) which is believed to have originated in the Former Song Dynasty (420–479 AD) around the Hua Shan (Hua Mountain) area of Shaanxi Province.

History
There are written legends from the Kaiyuan reign (713–741 AD) of the Tang Dynasty (618–906 AD) about a Mount Hua knight named Cai Mao, who was famous for his prowess in combat and swordplay. Apparently Cai Mao had killed an enemy, a noble from Chang'an and had to go into hiding to escape the family's wrath.

400 years later we hear of Cai's descendants, Cai Tai and Cai Gang of Jining in Shandong Province; were reputed using the Hua Quan style in public competitions. It is because of this historical record that many credit these two brothers with preserving Hua Quan as we know it today. However, it was Cai Wanzhi of Jining during the reign of Jaiqing during the Ming Dynasty (1368–1644) who is credited with the finishing touches on Hua Quan by writing the book "The Secrets of Huaquan"; the finishing touches could just be that he wrote the book, nobody can say for sure. Cai Wanzhi had based the book on the traditional philosophy of combining the "three pure essences", or treasures, of Spirit (Shen), Intrinsic Energy (Chi), and Internal force (Jing). Therefore, this specific style of Kung Fu is sometimes referred to as "Kung Fu of Essence." It is also known as Glorious/Magnificent Boxing, China Fist, or "The Fist of Hua Mountain." (Hua, or "Wah"- meaning Glorious, is also synonymous for the word China/Chinese). In modern-day Hua Quan is considered to be one of the five major styles of Long Fist Gong Fu. It may be important to note that due to its translation and spelling, there is a different style of Hua Quan meaning "Flower Fist." ("Meihuaquan").

In classical and contemporary works of literary fiction and cinema (Wuxia stories), Hua Quan is renowned for its swordplay skill.  Historically the temples and monasteries on Hua Shan are quite ancient and the monks were renowned masters of Neidan, (Internal Alchemy) and the mountain was a designation for many martial artists, giving up common earthly life. Hua Shan is one of China's five Sacred Peaks of Taoism. According to sources Zhang San-feng, the Taoist sage and patriarch of Taijiquan studied at the monasteries of Hua Shan after his time at Shaolin in Song Shan and before retiring to Wudang Shan.  The lesser-known internal martial-art style of Liu He Ba Fa was also developed on Hua Shan by the Taoist sage Chen Tuan (871–989) during the Song Dynasty (960–1280 AD). It is important to note that the Hua Shan area played an important role for self-cultivation and Chinese Martial Arts development, like many of the other mountain regions (Song Shan, Er-Mei, Wudang, etc.).

Hua style was also brought into Shaolin Temple most notably by Emperor Taizu of Song, it is one of the four arts he brought into the temple.  His martial art style (after extensive training with renowned northern masters), based on Hua Quan and other fists came to be known as "Emperor's Longfist", sometimes referenced as the premier Changquan style. There are also sets of forms the Shaolin monks adopted into their curriculum of training from the traditional Hua Quan system practised today (see reference).

Hua Quan's modern history begins with Grandmaster Cai Guigin, born in Shantung Province in 1877 during the later years of Qing Dynasty.  As a boy, Cai Guigin learned his families boxing from his grandfather, and later, after his grandfather's death, from Master Ding Yushan, another Hua Quan master. Cai Guigin stood out during his life as being acknowledged as THE Hua Quan Grandmaster of his time. Beginning in 1897, Cai Guigin began to travel throughout China, specifically its southern provinces, spreading his boxing techniques along the way during a time of great change and revolution in China's history until he finally settled in Shanghai in the 1920s.

Characteristics
Hua Quan is an old style with a huge repertoire of techniques and forms. It stands as a complete system of martial art. There are traditionally 48 hand sets to master in the system - 18 primary forms, 18 secondary forms (sparring sets) and 12 advanced forms referred to as roads, as well as, Chin Na, long and short weapons sets and specialized training methods. As the style spread throughout the region, it became named after its place of origin- the Hua Shan area around Shaanxi Province.  A highly developed style, there is an old saying in a form of a poem that basically states "knowing the 48 hand sets of Hua Quan, one can travel anywhere under the heavens.".

Hua Quan is characterized by its smooth, well-connected movements. Its techniques are executed "like a fast burst of wind" and its flawless stances are "as rooted as the pine tree" (excerpt from the "12 patterns" of Hua Quan training). Hua Quan practitioners breath deeply to spread air flows throughout the body, and the Hua Quan practitioner develops external/internal strength and energy for fighting, in particular cun jing (inch energy). Its footwork and hand technique are based on the Taoist philosophy of Yin and Yang. Hua Quan is considered a Traditional Northern Kung Fu style, and is a perfect example of a "classical" long-arm style, although there is no shortage of mid-close range techniques.  The Hua Quan 24 Essentials rests on the principles of four hits (each category being quite extensive), 8 methods and 12 patterns. Eleven basic aspects of practice include use of shoulder, back, hip, knee, leg, foot, arm, elbow, fist, palm and claw.

Hua Quan is also said to have the energies of five animals, although different from the "Shaolin Five Animals" System which are animal imitation forms.  The energies of the Hua Quan 5 Animals are: Ape, Tiger, Dragon, Leopard, and Eagle. The older the style such as Hua Quan, the energies are used to develop and internalize the essence of the movement creating proper power, technique and form.  Hua Quan is an old Taoist style in origin.

The art today
In the present day, Hua Quan is one of the main constituents of the modern "Changquan" (longfist) routines in contemporary Wushu taught in Sports Academies throughout China due to the efforts of one of the few remaining Hua Quan Grandmasters Cai Longyun (aka "the Big Dragon", son of Grandmaster Cai Guigin) when he wrote manuals on the first four roads and two of the sparring sets of the Hua Quan system (which are considered to be advanced, not beginner, forms), and collaborated with the Chinese Wushu Committee in the 1950s in creating beginner, intermediate, and advanced Wushu basics and curriculums.  Cai Longyun is Vice Chairman of the Chinese Wushu Association, and an associate professor of the Shanghai Sports Academy.

Much of Hua Quan has been lost, absorbed, or modified by other systems and masters throughout the centuries, making the old traditional system hard to find. Currently, Sigung Joe Maury's primary focus is on preserving Hua Quan to be as authentic and complete as the original art dating back to the Former Song Dynasty (420 AD). He has dedicated his life to the glory of spreading and teaching the original system of Hua Quan (Glorious Boxing), as passed down from generation to generation from the last recorded Hua Quan Grandmaster, Cai Guiging. Sigung Maury teaches Hua Quan as it was taught to him by Master Chen who learned it from his father who had learned Hua Quan directly from Grandmaster Cai Guigin in the early 1900s.  
        
Hua Quan is a historical style, a classic Kung Fu style which is beautiful in appearance and effective in combat. The old Hua Quan manual states "practice boxing as if a boat floating on water; running along smoothly for a thousand miles, avoiding the barbaric style of practicing martial arts which leads to disorders of the body and mind".

References

External links
 Shaolin Wolf (info on Hua Quan)
 Shaolin Kung Fu Centers (Hua Quan School)
 Plum Pub Publications (examples of Hua Quan forms)
 Chinese Masters- Cai Longyun (Grandmaster Cai Longyun)
 (Plum Publications Hua Quan Overview)
 (Babu Quan- beginner set from Hua Mountain style.)

Chinese martial arts